The 2017 Jamaican Athletics Championships was the year's national outdoor track and field championships for Jamaica. It was held from 22–25 June at the Independence Park in Kingston, Jamaica.

Results

Men

Women

References

Results
FloTrack - 2017 Jamaican National Senior Championships. Flotrack. Retrieved 2021-04-02.
2017 National Senior Champs Results. Jamaica Athletics Administrative Association. Retrieved 2021-04-02.

External links
 Jamaica Athletics Administrative Association website

Jamaican Athletics Championships
Jamaican Athletics Championships
Jamaican Athletics Championships
Jamaican Athletics Championships
Sport in Kingston, Jamaica